The Underwater Search and Rescue Group Command is affiliated with the Turkish Naval Forces. Its duties are to carry out underwater training of the Naval Forces Command and other units, to train 1st class divers andunderwater defense personnel, and to participate in search and rescue activities at times of war and peace. In 2017, the TCG Alemdar was put into service and the capabilities of the unit were upgraded. 

Search and rescue activities can be carried out up to a depth of 600 meters.

With the Atmospheric Diving System, divers, who can go as far down as 365 meters, can provide life packages and air support to submarines.

Affiliated Troops 

 Underwater Defence (Turkish Armed Forces)
 Rescue Group Command

See also 

 Turkish Naval Forces
 TCG Alemdar
Underwater searches

References 

Rescue
Turkish Naval Forces